Denmark competed at the 1996 Summer Olympics in Atlanta, United States. 119 competitors, 54 men and 65 women, took part in 66 events in 14 sports.

Medalists

Gold
 Poul-Erik Høyer-Larsen — Badminton, Men's Singles Competition
 Thomas Poulsen, Eskild Ebbesen, Victor Feddersen, and Niels Henriksen — Rowing, Men's Lightweight Coxless Four 
 Kristine Roug — Sailing, Women's Europe Class
 Dorthe Tanderup, Gitte Madsen, Lene Rantala, Gitte Sunesen, Tonje Kjærgaard, Janne Kolling, Susanne Lauritsen, Conny Hamann, Anja Hansen, Anette Hoffmann, Heidi Astrup, Tina Bøttzau, Marianne Florman, Anja Jul Andersen, Camilla Andersen, and Kristine Andersen — Handball, Women's Team Competition

Silver
 Rolf Sørensen — Cycling, Men's Individual Road Race

Bronze
 Trine Hansen — Rowing, Women's Single Sculls

Athletics

Men's 20 km Walk
Claus Jørgensen
 Final —  1.25:28 (→ 29th place)

Men's Pole Vault
 Martin Voss
 Qualification — 5.40m (→ did not advance)

Men's Hammer Throw 
 Jan Bielecki
 Qualification — 69.40m (→ did not advance)

Women's 5,000 metres
 Nina Christiansen
 Qualification — 15:56.38 (→ did not advance)

Women's Long Jump
 Renata Nielsen
 Qualification — no mark (→ did not advance)

Women's Javelin Throw
 Jette Jeppesen
 Qualification — 56.16m (→ did not advance)

Women's Marathon
 Gitte Karlshøj — did not finish (→ no ranking)

Badminton

Boxing

Men's Welterweight (– 67 kg)
Hasan Al
 First Round — Defeated Rogelio Martínez (Dominican Republic), referee stopped contest in third round
 Second Round — Defeated Sergiy Dzindziruk (Ukraine), 10–4 
 Quarterfinals — Lost to Marian Simion (Romania), 8–16

Men's Middleweight (– 75 kg)
Brian Johansen
 First Round — Lost to Dilshod Yarbekov (Uzbekistan), referee stopped contest in third round

Canoeing

Cycling

Road Competition
Men's Individual Time Trial
Bjarne Riis 
 Final — 1:07:47 (→ 14th place)
Rolf Sørensen
 Final — did not start (→ no ranking)

Track Competition
Men's Points Race
 Jan Bo Petersen
 Final — 7 points (→ 18th place)

Mountain Bike
Men's Cross Country
 Lennie Kristensen
 Final — 2:26:02 (→ 7th place)
 Jan Erik Østergaard
 Final — 2:34:30 (→ 18th place)

Equestrian

Fencing

One female fencer represented Denmark in 1996.

Women's épée
 Eva Fjellerup

Football

Women's Team Competition
Team Roster
Dorthe Larsen  
Annette Laursen   
Bonny Madsen  
Kamma Flæng  
Rikke Holm  
Christina Petersen  
Birgit Christensen  
Lisbet Kolding 
Helle Jensen 
Gitte Krogh 
Lene Madsen  
Lene Terp 
Anne Nielsen 
Merete Pedersen   
Christina Bonde

Handball

Rowing

Sailing

Men

Women

Open

Match racing

Shooting

Men's Rapid-Fire Pistol (25 metres)
Anders Lau

Men's Small-Bore Rifle Three Positions (50 metres)
Jens Harskov Loczi

Men's Small-Bore Rifle Prone (50 metres)
Jens Harskov Loczi
Torben Grimmel

Men's Trap
Keld Hansen

Men's Skeet
Ole Riber Rasmussen

Women's Air Pistol (10 metres)
Susanne Meyerhoff
Majbritt Hjortshøj

Women's Sporting Pistol (25 metres)
Susanne Meyerhoff

Women's Air Rifle (10 metres)
Anni Bissø

Women's Small-Bore Rifle, Three Positions, 50 metres
Anni Bissø

Swimming

Men's 200m Freestyle
 Jacob Carstensen
 Heat — 1:50.79
 B-Final — 1:50.54 (→ 14th place)

Men's 400m Freestyle
 Jacob Carstensen
 Heat — 3:52.62
 Final — 3:54.45 (→ 8th place)

Men's 1500m Freestyle
 Jacob Carstensen
 Heat — 15:43.75 (→ did not advance, 23rd place)

Women's 50m Freestyle
 Mette Nielsen
 Heat — 26.50 (→ did not advance, 28th place)

Women's 100m Freestyle
 Mette Jacobsen
 Heat — 56.06
 Final — 56.01 (→ 7th place)

Women's 400m Freestyle
 Britt Raaby
 Heat — 4:21.46 (→ did not advance, 25th place)

Women's 100m Backstroke
 Mette Jacobsen
 Heat — 1:03.14
 B-Final — scratched

Women's 200m Backstroke
 Mette Jacobsen
 Heat — 2:16.68 (→ did not advance, 17th place)

Women's 100m Butterfly
 Mette Jacobsen
 Heat — 1:00.91
 Final — 1:00.76 (→ 8th place)
 Sophia Skou
 Heat — 1:01.25
 B-Final — 1:00.95 (→ 11th place)

Women's 200m Butterfly
 Sophia Skou
 Heat — 2:13.59
 B-Final — 2:12.41 (→ 9th place)

Women's 200m Individual Medley
 Britta Vestergaard
 Heat — 2:18.35
 B-Final — 2:17.95 (→ 14th place)

Women's 400m Individual Medley
 Britta Vestergaard
 Heat — 4:55.03 (→ did not advance, 20th place)

Women's 4 × 100 m Freestyle Relay
 Mette Nielsen, Mette Jacobsen, Karen Egdal, and Ditte Jensen
 Heat — 3:48.93 (→ did not advance, 13th place)

Women's 4 × 200 m Freestyle Relay
 Ditte Jensen, Britta Vestergaard, Britt Raaby, and Berit Puggaard 
 Heat — 8:16.32 (→ did not advance, 13th place)

Tennis

Men's Singles Competition
 Frederik Fetterlein 
 First round — Defeated Jacco Eltingh (Netherlands) 6–4 4–6 8–6
 Second round — Lost to Marc Rosset (Switzerland) 6–7 5–7
 Kenneth Carlsen 
 First round — Defeated Mark Knowles (Bahamas) 7–5 6–3
 Second round — Defeated Jason Stoltenberg (Australia) 6–2 3–6 6–3
 Third round — Lost to MaliVai Washington (United States) 7–6 0–6 2–6

References

Nations at the 1996 Summer Olympics
1996 Summer Olympics
Summer Olympics